The 2007 Elf Renault Clio Cup United Kingdom season began at Brands Hatch on 31 March and finished after 12 races over 10 events at Thruxton on 14 October. The Championship was won by Martin Byford driving for his own Z Speed Racing team, despite not winning a race.

Changes for 2007
The new Clio Cup 197 was introduced.
A new race format was introduced which featured two qualifying heats and a final due to an over-subscribed entry.

Race Format
After Friday testing at each event the field would be split into two groups (group A for drivers finishing the session in odd-numbered positions and group B for drivers finishing in even-numbered positions). Each group would then have separate qualifying sessions on the Saturday which set the grids for the heats. The heat races set the grid for Sunday's championship race, where the winner of the heat containing the fastest lap time of the two heats would start on pole, with the remainder of the field from that heat filling the pole side of the grid in finishing order. The drivers from the other heat would fill the other side of the grid, again, in finishing order. The last few (the number varied from circuit to circuit) finishers in each heat would fail to qualify for the championship race but would be classed as reserves should there be any non-starters.

At meetings where the entry was smaller than the maximum number of permitted starters, the race format was the same as in previous years.

Teams and drivers
All competitors raced in Renault Clio Cup 197s.

Calendar & Winners
The series supported the British Touring Car Championship at nine of the ten rounds. The series skipped the round at Knockhill and instead raced at the World Series by Renault meeting at Donington Park on 8-9 September.

Standings
Points were awarded on a 32, 28, 25, 22, 20, 18, 16, 14, 12, 11, 10, 9, 8, 7, 6, 5, 4, 3, 2, 1 basis to the top 20 finishers in each race, with 2 bonus points for the fastest lap in each race. All scores counted towards the championship.

Drivers' Championship

Notes:
1. - Stefan Hodgetts was docked three points at Snetterton and six points at the second Brands Hatch meeting.
2. - Robert Lawson was docked two points at Snetterton.
3. - Jim Edwards Jr. was docked three points at the second Donington Park meeting.
4. - Ben Winrow was docked three points at the first Brands Hatch meeting.
5. - Ed Pead was docked three points at Rockingham, three points at the second Thruxton meeting as well as a further three point penalty.
6. - Chris Dymond was docked two points at the first Brands Hatch meeting and six points at Oulton Park.
7. - Andrew Herron was docked two points at the first Thruxton meeting, two points at Snetterton as well as a further two point penalty.
8. - Mark Speller was docked two points at Snetterton.
9. - Andrew Jordan was docked eight points at the second Brands Hatch meeting, two points at the second Donington Park meeting as well as a further two point penalty.
10. - Árón Smith was docked two points at Rockingham, two points at Croft as well as a further two point penalty.
11. - Jonathan Fildes was docked two points at the second Brands Hatch meeting.
12. - Dan Eagling was docked two points at Snetterton.
13. - Barry Benham was docked two points at the first Thruxton meeting, two points at Croft, six points at the second Brands Hatch meeting as well as a further two point penalty.
14. - David Shepherd was docked two points at Rockingham, two points at the second Donington Park meeting as well as a further two point penalty.
15. - Andrew Bentley was docked three points at the first Donington Park meeting.
16. - Robert Gaffney was docked two points at the second Donington Park meeting.
17. - Ant Scragg was docked three points at the first Donington Park meeting.
18. - Niki Lanik was docked two points at Croft, four points at Snetterton, two points at the second Donington Park meeting as well as a further eight point penalty.
19. - Robert Brown was docked four points at Rockingham and six points at the second Brands Hatch meeting.
20. - Chris Panayiotou was docked two points at the first Donington Park meeting.
21. - Alex MacDowall was docked three points at Rockingham, six points at Oulton Park, six points at the second Brands Hatch meeting as well as a further ten point penalty.
22. - Carl Bradley was docked two points at the first Brands Hatch meeting.
23. - Ciaran Butler was docked two points at Oulton Park.
24. - Jonathan Shepherd was docked three points at Croft.
25. - Steve Collison was docked two points at the first Brands Hatch meeting.
26. - Chris Rice was docked two points at the second Brands Hatch meeting.
27. - Dean Hobson was docked two points at the first Donington Park meeting.
28. - Alan Taylor was docked four points at the first Donington Park meeting, six points at the second Brands Hatch meeting as well as a further two point penalty.

Notes:
1. - Stefan Hodgetts was docked three points at Snetterton and six points at the second Brands Hatch meeting.
2. - Robert Lawson was docked two points at Snetterton.
3. - Jim Edwards Jr. was docked three points at the second Donington Park meeting.
4. - Ben Winrow was docked three points at the first Brands Hatch meeting.
5. - Ed Pead was docked three points at Rockingham, three points at the second Thruxton meeting as well as a further three point penalty.
6. - Chris Dymond was docked two points at the first Brands Hatch meeting and six points at Oulton Park.
7. - Andrew Herron was docked two points at the first Thruxton meeting, two points at Snetterton as well as a further two point penalty.
8. - Mark Speller was docked two points at Snetterton.
9. - Andrew Jordan was docked eight points at the second Brands Hatch meeting, two points at the second Donington Park meeting as well as a further two point penalty.
10. - Árón Smith was docked two points at Rockingham, two points at Croft as well as a further two point penalty.
11. - Jonathan Fildes was docked two points at the second Brands Hatch meeting.
12. - Dan Eagling was docked two points at Snetterton.
13. - Barry Benham was docked two points at the first Thruxton meeting, two points at Croft, six points at the second Brands Hatch meeting as well as a further two point penalty.
14. - David Shepherd was docked two points at Rockingham, two points at the second Donington Park meeting as well as a further two point penalty.
15. - Andrew Bentley was docked three points at the first Donington Park meeting.
16. - Robert Gaffney was docked two points at the second Donington Park meeting.
17. - Ant Scragg was docked three points at the first Donington Park meeting.
18. - Niki Lanik was docked two points at Croft, four points at Snetterton, two points at the second Donington Park meeting as well as a further eight point penalty.
19. - Robert Brown was docked four points at Rockingham and six points at the second Brands Hatch meeting.
20. - Chris Panayiotou was docked two points at the first Donington Park meeting.
21. - Alex MacDowall was docked three points at Rockingham, six points at Oulton Park, six points at the second Brands Hatch meeting as well as a further ten point penalty.
22. - Carl Bradley was docked two points at the first Brands Hatch meeting.
23. - Ciaran Butler was docked two points at Oulton Park.
24. - Jonathan Shepherd was docked three points at Croft.
25. - Steve Collison was docked two points at the first Brands Hatch meeting.
26. - Chris Rice was docked two points at the second Brands Hatch meeting.
27. - Dean Hobson was docked two points at the first Donington Park meeting.
28. - Alan Taylor was docked four points at the first Donington Park meeting, six points at the second Brands Hatch meeting as well as a further two point penalty.

Winter Cup
The Winter Cup was contested over two rounds at Donington Park on 3 November and Croft on 10 November. It was won by Niki Lanik driving for Youth 4 Human Rights with SVE.

Teams & Drivers

Calendar & Winners

Drivers' Championship
Points were awarded on the same scale as the main championship. All scores counted.

External links
 Official website
 ClioCup.com
 Timing Solutions Ltd.

Renault Clio Cup
Renault Clio Cup UK seasons